Yiannis (or possibly Yannis) Maltezos (Γιάννης Μαλτέζος) (Smyrna, 1915 - Paris, 1987) was a Greek painter and visual artist who spent much of his working life in Paris.

Personal life
Yiannis Maltezos was born in 1915 in the Boutzas district of Smyrna, today's İzmir, Turkey, where his father ran a timber business also selling paints and other materials for domestic and artistic use. With those materials readily available to him, Yiannis started painting around the age of six.

Following the events of World War I and its aftermath when the majority of the Greek population of Smyrna left the city, the family first settled in Heraklion for six years, later moving to Athens.

In March 1959 he married the Greek-American Helen Kosmas (1924-2016), and they moved the same year to Paris.

Maltezos died in Paris in 1987, but is buried in Athens.

Artistic career
Maltezos studied at the Athens School of Fine Arts where he attended classes while at the same time working in a private workshop.

He also worked as a set designer for the National Theatre of Greece before World War II.

After the war, he began experimenting with an abstract expressionist style, applying a 'drip technique'.

Maltezos first exhibited at the Greek National Exhibition of 1939, and his first solo exhibition was held in La Galerie Mouffe in Paris in 1962. He also took part among other things in the 1959 edition of the São Paulo Art Biennial.

Maltezos is considered one of the first artists to introduce abstract art to Greece.  He later moved artistically towards gestural and abstract expressionism and op art.

References

1915 births
1987 deaths
People from İzmir
Smyrniote Greeks
Greeks from the Ottoman Empire
20th-century Greek painters
Abstract artists
Abstract expressionist artists
20th-century Greek sculptors
Emigrants from the Ottoman Empire to Greece
Greek emigrants to France